Myanmar Idol is a popular Myanmar singing contest television series that is broadcast on MNTV. Its first season, in 2015, was described by The Myanmar Times as a "wild success". Due to its popularity, it has been extended for a fifth season in 2020. Since Season 3, the competition format has utilized a wild card during the top 4+1 show.

Judges 

Ye Lay (1)
Chan Chan (1)
May Sweet (1, 2)
Myanmar Pyi Thein Tan (2, 3)
Tin Zar Maw (2, 3, 4)
Yan Aung (3)
Myo Kyawt Myaing (3)
Aung Ko Latt (4)
Phyu Phyu Kyaw Thein (4)

Winners 

Saw Lah Htaw Wah (Season 1)
Thar Nge (Season 2)
Phyo Myat Aung (Season 3)
Esther Dawt Chin Sung (Season 4)

Episodes
Season 1

Season 2

Season 3

Season 4

Series overview
Following the success of American Idol and other IDOL series, Shwe Thanlwin created a Myanmar version of the series with identical formats and methods. Broadcast on Myanmar Network TV on Sky Net, it grew to be more popular than Dream Encounters (အိပ်မက်ဆုံရာ) and Melody World, which were once the most popular singing competition series in Myanmar.

Host and judges 
The inaugural season of Myanmar Idol featured 3 judges: Burmese singers Ye Lay, Chan Chan and May Sweet. Since then, various combinations of 3 to 4 judges, including Tin Zar Maw, Myo Kyawt Myaing, Myanmar Pyi Thein Tan, Yan Aung, Aung Ko Latt, and Phyu Phyu Kyaw Thein, have served in the judge panel. The show has been hosted by Kyaw Htet Aung since Season 1.

Season 1 

In 2015, the first Myanmar Idol season held auditions in four major cities: Yangon, Mandalay, Pathein and Taunggyi. The series judges, Ye Lay, Chan Chan and May Sweet chose the Top 11 finalists. After further stages, the Top 3 finalists, Saw Lah Htaw Wah, M Zaw Rain and Hninzi May advanced to the Grand Final Show, where Saw Lah Htaw Wah became Myanmar Idol winner of the first season.

Season 2 

Season 2, in 2016, featured Tin Zar Maw, Myanmar Pyi Thein Tan and May Sweet as judges; with auditions held in 5 major cities, Yangon, Mandalay, Naypyidaw, Taunggyi and Hpa-An, and bus auditions also held in other towns. Later in the series, the judges decided who would be in the Final Top 10, and, after further stages, the series advanced to the Grand Final Show held on 25 March 2017, where the two finalists, Thar Nge and Billy La Min Aye, competed with three songs. With the voting results of the whole country counted, Thar Nge was announced winner of the
second season.

Season 3 

During Season 3, in 2018, two new judges, Yan Aung and Myo Kyawt Myaing, joined Myanmar Pyi Thein Tan and Tin Zar Maw. After progressing to the Grand Final, ChanMyae MgCho was unable to participate due to illness. Phyo Myat Aung won the third season of Myanmar Idol. Zawgyi came back a wild card during the semi-finals.

Top 11 Finalists are Phyo Myat Aung, ChanMyae MgCho, Zaw Gyi, Ngwe Zin Hlaing, Nay Khant Min Thit, Nilen Parmawi, May Madi, Pyae Phyo, Naw Jas, Nan Shwe Yee, Swan Pyae Aung.

Season 4 

Season 4 of Myanmar Idol was aired on Channel 9. The judges were Tin Zar Maw, Phyu Phyu Kyaw Thein and Aung Ko Latt. Benjamin Sum, Aye Mya Phyu, Esther Dawt Chin Sung, Yaw Kee, Htet Inzali, Naw Say Say Htoo, Nay Lin Kyaw, Chu Sit Han, Hninn Ei Ei Win, Tan Khun Kyaw and Saw Chris Moo Ler are the top 11 finalists. Tan Khun Kyaw returned to the semi-finals with the Channel-9 wild card. Chu Sit Han, Nay Lin Kyaw, Hninn Ei Ei Win, Tan Khun Kyaw, Htet Inzali, Naw Say Say Htoo and Yaw Kee were nominated for the Channel 9 Wild Card. The finalists were Benjamin Sum, Aye Mya Phyu  and Esther Dawt Chin Sung to complete the grand final. The grand final (as usual) was located in Hexagon Complex, and voting was available after the top 4+1 result show from that day (20-12-2019) to (28-12-2019) and the GRAND FINAL was aired in Channel 9 and the time was 20:30. Esther Dawt Chin Sung won the fourth season of Myanmar Idol and the first girl winner of Myanmar Idol.

Season details

Finalists

References

Singing competitions
Myanmar Idol
Idols (franchise)
Burmese television series
2015 television series debuts
Non-British television series based on British television series